Stadionul Cetatea is a multi-purpose stadium in Târgu Neamț, Romania. It is currently used mostly for football matches and is the home ground of Bradu Borca. In the past, the stadium was the home ground of FC Ozana Târgu Neamț. The stadium holds 2,000 people.

External links
Stadionul Cetatea at soccerway.com

Football venues in Romania
Buildings and structures in Neamț County